The Erie and Pittsburgh Railroad was a railroad based in Erie, Pennsylvania incorporated on 1 April 1858. Operations began in March 1860. It operated jointly with Buffalo and State Line Railroad from an indeterminate date until 28 February 1870, in connection with the latter's commitment, along with the Erie and North East Railroad, to complete track construction between Jamestown, Pennsylvania, and Girard, Pennsylvania. The railroad was leased as of 1 April 1870, by the Pennsylvania Railroad.

William Lawrence Scott, trustee for EPR and the Pennsylvania Railroad, bought the Erie Canal Company (owner of the Erie Extension Canal) at a sheriff's sale on 29 November 1870. The deed was conveyed to EPR as of 22 March 1871.

EPR held stock in Pennsylvania Railroad and Pittsburgh, Bessemer and Lake Erie Railroad.

EPR operated  of track:
 Girard Junction to Jamestown, Pennsylvania; 
 Greenville, Pennsylvania to the Shenango River
 Clarksville to Sharpsville, Pennsylvania; 
 Jamestown to New Castle, Pennsylvania; 
 Dock Junction to Erie, Pennsylvania;

External links 
 Pennsylvania Railroad, Corporate Genealogy, Erie & Pittsburgh (June 1918)
 Beaver Extension Canal and Erie Extension

Defunct Pennsylvania railroads
Railway companies established in 1858
Railway companies disestablished in 1976
Predecessors of the Pennsylvania Railroad
4 ft 10 in gauge railways in the United States
1858 establishments in Pennsylvania
American companies established in 1858